M-110 was the designation of a former state trunkline highway in the US state of Michigan. The highway was a  spur that provided access from US Highway 31 (US 31) to Orchard Beach State Park. The highway was designated in 1927 and lasted until 2003.

Route description
The southern terminus of M-110 was at a junction with US 31 near Parkdale on the northern boundary of the city of Manistee. From there, the trunkline traveled north along Lake Shore Road near Lake Michigan. Along the way, the highway passed through the unincorporated community of Parkdale. The landscape contains fields as the roadway approaches the forest at Orchard Beach State Park. M-110 continues past the park and terminated at an intersection with Kott Road.

History
A highway was first designated along Lakeshore Road in 1927 bearing the M-110 designation. The highway was improved the following year. That year, M-110 was listed as one of a few rural highways that was lighted. In a 1972 profile, M-110 was listed as one of the 13 shortest highways in the state, noting its connection to Orchard Beach State Park.

In 2003, the Michigan Department of Transportation (MDOT) transferred M-110 to the Manistee County Road Commission. In the last traffic surveys before the transfer, MDOT determined that an average of 2,335 vehicles used M-110 on a daily basis in 2002.

Major intersections

See also

References

External links

Former M-110 at Michigan Highways

110
Transportation in Manistee County, Michigan